Nasta Palazhanka (born 1990) is an activist in the opposition youth movement in Belarus, which she joined at the age of 14. 
As of 2011 she is Deputy Chairperson of the Malady Front (Young Front), an NGO in Belarus. She has advocated for freedom and human rights in Belarus despite threats, harassment, and imprisonment.

She received a 2011 International Women of Courage award. 
However, she was unable to attend the ceremony.

As of September 2011, she was engaged to another Young Front activist, Zmitser Dashkevich. The two married when Palazhanka visited him in Hrodno prison on 26 December 2012.

References

Living people
Belarusian activists
Belarusian women activists
Belarusian dissidents
1990 births
Recipients of the International Women of Courage Award